Mesdaraq is a village in Naqdi Rural District, Meshgin-e Sharqi District, Meshgin Shahr County, Ardabil Province, Iran. At the 2006 census, its population was 88, in 15 families.

References 

Towns and villages in Meshgin Shahr County